John Campbell (c. 1789 – c. 1866) was the fifth Treasurer of the United States, serving under both Presidents Andrew Jackson and Martin Van Buren. He was in office from May 26, 1829 to July 20, 1839.  Campbell has the distinction of being the first Treasurer to be born a citizen of the United States.

External links
 Phil Norfleet, "Will of John Campbell (ca. 1789-1866)," Southwest Virginia Campbells.
 List of U.S. Treasurers, Department of the Treasury.

Treasurers of the United States
1780s births
1860s deaths
19th-century American politicians

References